The Whitewater Hotel in Whitewater, Wisconsin was built in 1894.

It was renovated in 2006.

According to the National Park Service:
Between its construction in 1894 and its general demise as a functioning hotel around 1952, the Whitewater Hotel was an important component in the commercial life of the city of Whitewater. During this period, Whitewater's economy was almost entirely dependent upon commerce and the only area of growth was in agricultural commerce. The Whitewater Hotel had a prime location near businesses catering to agricultural commerce. The Hotel's location across the street from the Whitewater Passenger Depot gave it a ready-made clientele for people using the railroad. In 2006 the Whitewater Hotel was renovated under the federal and state tax credit program for the historic renovation of National Register-eligible buildings. Today, the building is used for apartments and a cafe.

The building was listed on the U.S. National Register of Historic Places on January 21, 2010. The listing was announced as the featured listing in the National Park Service's weekly list of January 29, 2010.

References

External links

Hotel buildings on the National Register of Historic Places in Wisconsin
Buildings and structures in Walworth County, Wisconsin
Hotels established in 1894
Hotel buildings completed in 1894
Railway hotels in the United States
National Register of Historic Places in Walworth County, Wisconsin
Whitewater, Wisconsin
1894 establishments in Wisconsin